Mutaib bin Abdullah Al Rashid (died January 1869) was the third ruler of the Emirate of Jabal Shammar whose reign was very brief between 1868 and 1869.

Biography
Mutaib was one of the sons of Abdullah bin Ali Al Rashid who established the Emirate of Jabal Shammar in 1836 and ruled it until 1848. He had two brothers, Talal and Muhammad.

Mutaib succeeded his older brother, Talal, in 1868. In January 1869 he was shot and killed in the Barzan Palace by his nephews, Bandar bin Talal and Badr bin Talal. One of the reasons for the murder of Mutaib is cited by R. Bayly Winder as the maltreatment of Bandar and his siblings by their uncle and emir Mutaib. Following the killing of Mutaib Bandar became the emir of Jabal Shammar and the family members left Ha'il for Riyadh where they were given refuge by the Al Saud.

One of Mutaib's sons, Abdulaziz, was adopted by his uncle, Muhammad, and ruled the Emirate between 1897 and 1906.

References

External links

19th-century monarchs in the Middle East
19th-century murdered monarchs
1869 deaths
1869 murders in the Ottoman Empire
Arabs from the Ottoman Empire
House of Rashid
People from Ha'il
Sons of monarchs
Year of birth missing